The Institute for Social Research (IfS) is a research organization for sociology and continental philosophy, best known as the institutional home of the Frankfurt School and critical theory. Currently a part of Goethe University Frankfurt, it has historically also been affiliated with Columbia University in New York City.

History

The Institute was founded in Frankfurt am Main in 1923, where it was (and  once again is) affiliated with the University of Frankfurt am Main. It was founded by Felix Weil, a student of the Marxist philosopher Karl Korsch, with an endowment provided by Weil's wealthy father Hermann Weil. Its first director, Kurt Albert Gerlach, died before making his mark, and was swiftly followed by Carl Grünberg, a Marxist historian who gathered together fellow "orthodox" Marxists at the Institute, including his former pupil Henryk Grossman.   Grünberg was followed by co-founder Friedrich Pollock.

Following a non-fatal heart attack, Grünberg was succeeded in 1930 by Max Horkheimer.  Horkheimer rapidly became the guiding spirit of the Frankfurt School, a group of thinkers that was born under his directorship at the Institute. Horkheimer edited the group's journal Zeitschrift für Sozialforschung (Journal for Social Research) and wrote essays defining a critical theory of society.

The growing influence of the Nazis led the founders to decide in September 1930 to prepare to move the Institute out of Germany, by establishing a branch in Geneva and moving the funds to the Netherlands. In 1933, after the rise of Hitler, the Institute left Germany for Geneva and then in 1934 moved to New York City.  In New York it became affiliated with Columbia University, and its journal Zeitschrift für Sozialforschung was renamed Studies in Philosophy and Social Science.  It was there that much of the important work of the Frankfurt School thinkers began to emerge, and the Institute's residence in New York was likely partly accountable for its work's favorable reception in American and English academia.

The Institute re-opened in Frankfurt in 1951 under the direction of Pollock.

The Institute has been both a research enterprise and, during its Frankfurt periods, a provider of instruction in sociology at the university there. The current acting director is Ferdinand Sutterlüty, who has followed on from Axel Honneth's directorship of 2001 to 2018.

References

External links

The Institute of Social Research
History of the Institute of Social Research 
Download the Zeitschrift für Sozialforschung (1932-1941), the Institute of Social Research's journal 

Columbia University
Education in Frankfurt
Frankfurt School
Goethe University Frankfurt
Marxist theory
Social philosophy
Social research
Sociological organizations
Sociological theories
Weimar culture